Happy Sichikolo (born 22 November 1973) is a Zambian footballer. He played in five matches for the Zambia national football team in 1994. He was also named in Zambia's squad for the 1994 African Cup of Nations tournament.

References

1973 births
Living people
Zambian footballers
Zambia international footballers
1994 African Cup of Nations players
Association football midfielders
People from Kabwe District